Tenby Castle was a fortification standing on a headland separated by an isthmus from the town of Tenby, Pembrokeshire, Wales. The remaining stone structure dates from the 13th century but there are mentions of the castle from as early as 1153. It is a Grade II* listed building.

History

Construction

The castle, which was sited on a rocky promontory, was founded by the Normans during their invasion of West Wales in the 12th century. A stone tower was built on the headland's highest point which was protected by a curtain wall. The walls had a gateway and several small towers on the landward side. A lesser sea wall surrounded the remainder of the site and the beach area to the west.

In 1153, the castle was captured and destroyed by Maredudd ap Gruffydd and Rhys ap Gruffydd (sons of Gruffydd ap Rhys), the future ruler of the south-western petty kingdom of Deheubarth in mid Wales. The castle was besieged again by the Welsh in 1187. Almost a century later, Llywelyn ap Gruffudd (prince of Gwynedd, and son of Gruffudd ap Llywelyn) sacked the town during his campaigns to retake South Wales in 1260 but the castle was not taken by the Welsh.

Abandonment
By the late 13th century, Tenby castle and the town had become part of the Marcher Lordship of Pembroke, which by then was ruled by William de Valence, 1st Earl of Pembroke. The French knight, who was married to the Joan de Munchensi, the granddaughter and heir of the previous Earl of Pembroke, had provided military service to Henry III in the Second Barons' War. He instigated the building of stone walls around the town. By the start of the 14th century, the Tenby town walls were mostly completed so diminishing the defensive importance of Tenby Castle. In 1328, they were further strengthened when a D-shaped barbican was built to defend the town's main gate and additional D-shaped towers were later added to the northern and southern walls. By the 1400s, the line of Earls had died out, and Tenby castle was abandoned and in disrepair.

In 1457, King Henry VI gave the Marcher Lordship (and associated Earldom) to Jasper Tudor, his half-brother, who agreed to refurbish and improve Tenby's defences by dividing the cost between himself and the town's merchants. Raising the wall's height to include a second tier of higher arrow slits behind a new parapet walk and adding additional turret towers to the ends of the walls where they abutted the cliff edges.

In the mid 16th century, another large D-shaped tower (named the "Five Arches") was built in the Elizabethan period following fears about a second Spanish Armada.

In 1648 during the Second English Civil War, a unit of Royalists under the command of Rice Powell held a refortified Tenby for 10 weeks until they were starved into surrendering by besieging Parliamentarians.

Present day
A few features of the medieval castle remain. A path from Tenby harbour to the top of Castle Hill passes through the main square gateway. On the summit of the promontory is a small tower. A circular walk which was laid out in the 19th century follows the line of the original curtain walls. Tenby Museum & Art Gallery is built on the remains of the castle's domestic building, probably the great hall.

Although the north gate has been demolished to widen the road, Tenby town walls on the north side are largely complete.
The eastern walls and towers remain intact.

See also 
 Tenby Castle (locomotive)

References

External links 
Tenby Castle

Castle
Castles in Pembrokeshire
Castle ruins in Wales
Grade II* listed buildings in Pembrokeshire
Grade II* listed castles in Wales